PP-1 Attock-I is a Constituency of Provincial Assembly of Punjab.

2018 Pakistani general election

Syed Yawer Abbas Bukhari from PTI succeeded in the election 2018 and became the member of Provincial Assembly of the Punjab.

2013 Pakistani general election

Syed Ejaz Hussain Bukhari from PTI succeeded in the election 2013 and became the member of Provincial Assembly of the Punjab.

See also
 PP-297 Rajanpur-III
 PP-2 Attock-II

References

External links
 Election commission Pakistan's official website
 Awazoday.com check result
 Official Website of Government of Punjab

Provincial constituencies of Punjab, Pakistan